The 1976 Appalachian State Mountaineers football team was an American football team that represented Appalachian State University as a member of the Southern Conference (SoCon) during the 1976 NCAA Division I football season. In their sixth year under head coach Jim Brakefield, the Mountaineers compiled an overall record of 6–4–1 with a mark of 2–2–1 in conference play, and finished third in the SoCon.

Schedule

References

Appalachian State
Appalachian State Mountaineers football seasons
Appalachian State Mountaineers football